Amin Patel is an Indian politician from Maharashtra. He is a three term Member of the Maharashtra Legislative Assembly. He won from the Mumbadevi Constituency of Mumbai.

Positions held 
Maharashtra Legislative Assembly MLA
Terms in office: 2009-2014, 2014-2019 and 2019-2024.
Dy leader congress party Maharashtra Vidhan Sabha

References

Living people
Maharashtra MLAs 2014–2019
Indian Muslims
Indian National Congress politicians
1963 births